The "Aigarchaeota" are a proposed archaeal phylum of which the main representative is Caldiarchaeum subterraneum. It is not yet clear if this represents a new phylum or a and order of the Nitrososphaerota, since the genome of Caldiarchaeum subterraneum encodes several Nitrososphaerota-like features. The name "Aigarchaeota" comes from the Greek , avgí, meaning "dawn" or "aurora", for the intermediate features of hyperthermophilic and mesophilic life during the evolution of its lineage.

Taxonomy
 Genus "Candidatus Caldarchaeum" corrig. Nunoura et al. 2011
 "Ca. C. subterraneum" corrig. Nunoura et al. 2011
 Genus "Candidatus Calditenuis" Beam et al. 2016
 "Ca. C. aerorheumensis" Beam et al. 2016

See also
 List of Archaea genera

References

Further reading 
 
 
 

Archaea phyla